Șugău may refer to the following places in Romania:

 Șugău, a tributary of the Iza in Maramureș County
 Șugău, a tributary of the Bicaz in Neamț County
 Șugău or Șugo, a tributary of the Olt in Harghita County
 Șugău or Șugo, alternative names for the Pârâul Șoptitor in Covasna County
 Șugău, a village in the municipality of Sighetu Marmației, Maramureș County